Ronco all'Adige is a comune (municipality) in the Province of Verona in the Italian region Veneto, located about  west of Venice and about  southeast of Verona.

Ronco all'Adige borders the following municipalities: Albaredo d'Adige, Belfiore, Isola Rizza, Oppeano, Palù, Roverchiara, and Zevio.

Demographic evolution

References

Cities and towns in Veneto